Señorita Panamá 2000, the 18th Señorita Panamá pageant and 35th celebration of the Miss Panamá contest, was held in Teatro Anayansi Centro de Convenciones Atlapa, Panama city, Panama, on September 1, 2000, after weeks of events. The winner of the pageant was Ivette Cordovez Usuga.

The pageant was broadcast on September 10 through RPC-TVPanamá Channel 4. About 12 contestants from all over Panamá competed for the prestigious crown. At the conclusion of the final night of competition, outgoing titleholder Analía Núñez Sagripanti of Chiriquí crowned Ivette Cordovez Usuga of Panama Centro as the new Señorita Panamá.

In the same night was celebrated the election of the "Señorita Panamá World",  was announced the winner of the Señorita Panamá Mundo title. Señorita Panamá World 1999 Jessenia Casanova Reyes of Panama Centro crowned Ana Raquel Ochy Pozo of Cocle as the new Señorita Panamá World. Also was selected the representative for the Miss Asia Pacific pageant Adriana Roquer Hidalgo of Panamá Este was crowned by Marianela Salazar Guillén of Panama Centro.

Cordovez competed in Miss Universe 2001 the 50th edition  of the Miss Universe pageant, held at the Coliseo Rubén Rodríguez, Bayamón, Puerto Rico on May 11, 2001.

In other hands González  competed in Miss World 2000, the 50th edition of the Miss World pageant, was held on 30 November 2000 at the Millennium Dome in London, United Kingdom.
Roquer Hidalgo competed in Miss Asia Pacific 2001 pageant, was held on 10 November 2001 at the NEC Tent, Fort Bonifacio, Makati, Philippines, where she placed in the Top 10.

Final result

Special awards

Judges
 Mingthoy M. Giro - Panamanian journalist.
 Raúl García de Paredes - Dermatologist.
 Magali Méndez - editor Mundo Social Magazine.
 Nabil Semaan - Figaly store represent.
 Lorena Zagia - Señorita Panamá World 1998.
 Luis Alfonso Ortega - Stylist.
 Marian Mario - designer.
 Luis Enrique Bandera - Asecomer Director.
 Dora de Díaz- Guillén - Dermatologist.

Contestants 
These are the competitors who have been selected this year.

Election schedule

Thursday September 1 Final night, coronation Señorita Panamá 2000

Candidates notes

Adriana Roquer  was a semi-finalist in Miss Asia-Pacific 2001.

References

External links
  Señorita Panamá  official website

Señorita Panamá
2000 beauty pageants